Transporter: The Series is an English language French–Canadian action television series that was broadcast from 2012 to 2014. Based on the Transporter action film franchise by Luc Besson, it featured Chris Vance in the main role as Frank Martin, the Transporter. Two seasons were produced, each comprising 12 episodes.

Series overview 
{| class="wikitable"  style="text-align:center;"
|-
! style="padding:0 8px;" colspan="2" rowspan="3"| Season
! rowspan="3" style="padding:0 8px; width:12px;"| Episodes
! colspan="2" rowspan="2"| Originally aired
! style="padding:0 8px;" colspan="2"| DVD & Blu-ray release date
|-
!  colspan="2"| Region 2
|-
! Season premiere
! Season finale
! Germany
! France
|-
 |bgcolor="#006600"|
 |[[List of Transporter: The Series episodes#Season 1 (2012–13)|1]]
 |12
 |
 |
 |
 |
|-
 |bgcolor="#00009f"|
 |[[List of Transporter: The Series episodes#Season 2 (2014)|2]]
 |12
 |
 |
 |
 |
|}

Episodes

Season 1 (2012–13)
The series as so far been presented in a different episode order on every channel it has aired (see above). It first aired in Germany, however channel RTL left two episodes unaired. The episodes were next broadcast in France on M6. However, the episodes are presented here in the order they were broadcast in Canada on HBO Canada as this airing order is generally considered to be "the most correct" order of the episodes in terms of plotline chronology.

Season 2 (2014)
Season 2 premiered in Canada on The Movie Network and Movie Central on 5 October 2014. Season 2 premiered in the United States on TNT on 29 November 2014.

References 

Lists of action television series episodes
Lists of Canadian television series episodes
Lists of French television series episodes
Transporter (franchise)